Brian Stewart Polian (born December 22, 1974) is an American college football coach and former player. He is the special teams coordinator for  LSU. He is the former head coach of the Nevada Wolf Pack football team. He is the son of former National Football League (NFL) executive Bill Polian.

Early life
Born in The Bronx, Polian graduated from Saint Francis High School in Athol Springs, New York, near Buffalo, in 1993. He attended John Carroll University near Cleveland, where he played on the football team as a linebacker from 1993 to 1996. He graduated with a bachelor's degree in history in 1997.

Coaching career

Early coaching career
Polian began his coaching career in 1997 as a graduate assistant at Michigan State. In 1998, he was the tight ends and offensive line assistant at the University at Buffalo. In 1999 and 2000, Polian was a defensive graduate assistant at Baylor under Kevin Steele. Polian graduated from Baylor with a master's degree in 2000.

Polian returned to Buffalo in 2001 as running backs coach and special teams coordinator, serving until 2003 all under coach Jim Hofher. In 2004, he was assistant coach at the same positions at UCF under George O'Leary. From 2005 to 2009, Polian was special teams coordinator at Notre Dame under Charlie Weis. He also served as defensive backs coach in 2005, linebackers coach in 2006, and inside linebackers coach in 2007. Notre Dame made three bowl appearances during Polian's tenure, including a win in the 2008 Hawaii Bowl.

He then was special teams coordinator and safeties coach at Stanford from 2010 to 2011 and was also recruiting coordinator in 2011. Part of Jim Harbaugh's staff in 2010, Polian remained at Stanford under succeeding coach David Shaw. Stanford won the 2011 Orange Bowl after the 2010 season. In 2012, Polian was special teams coordinator and tight ends coach under Kevin Sumlin at Texas A&M, which won the 2013 Cotton Bowl Classic that season.

Nevada
On January 11, 2013, the University of Nevada, Reno hired Polian as football head coach. On November 27, 2016, Nevada parted ways with Polian, 
effectively resulting in him being fired from Nevada based upon his poor performance.

Notre Dame
On December 16, 2016, Polian was hired to return to Notre Dame once again as special teams coordinator, this time under Brian Kelly.

LSU
On December 7, 2021, Polian was hired by LSU as the special teams coordinator, under Brian Kelly. In Feb 2023, Polian was demoted as Special Teams Coordinator and placed in a lesser off field position after LSU special teams received a ranking of 130 out of 131 FBS teams. This after several high-profile miscues in critical games, attributed to Polian.

Head coaching record

References

External links
 LSU profile
 Notre Dame profile
 Nevada profile
 Stanford profile
 John Carroll profile

1974 births
Living people
American football linebackers
Baylor Bears football coaches
Baylor University alumni
Buffalo Bulls football coaches
John Carroll Blue Streaks football players
LSU Tigers football coaches
Michigan State Spartans football coaches
Nevada Wolf Pack football coaches
Notre Dame Fighting Irish football coaches
Stanford Cardinal football coaches
Texas A&M Aggies football coaches
UCF Knights football coaches
Sportspeople from Erie County, New York
Sportspeople from the Bronx
Players of American football from New York City
Coaches of American football from New York (state)